Countess Mary Magdalene of Limburg-Stirum (1632 – 27 December 1707), official titles: gravin van Limburg en Bronkhorst, vrouwe van Stirum, Wisch en Borculo, erfbaandervrouw van het hertogdom Gelre en het graafschap Zutphen), was a countess from the House of Limburg-Stirum. Through her marriage to a count of Nassau-Siegen these possessions came into the possession of this cadet branch of the Ottonian Line of the House of Nassau.

Biography
Mary Magdalene was born in 1632 as the daughter and only child of Count George Ernest of Limburg-Stirum and his first wife Countess Magdalene of Bentheim-Tecklenburg. The exact date and place of birth of Mary Magdalene are unknown. As the only child of her father, Mary Magdalene was heiress to the County of Bronkhorst and the heerlijkheden of Wisch, Borculo, Lichtenvoorde and Wildenborch.

Mary Magdalene’s great-great-grandmother Countess Mary of Nassau-Siegen was a younger sister of Henry’s great-grandfather Count William I ‘the Rich’ of Nassau-Siegen.

The will and testament of Count John VII ‘the Middle’ of 1621 bequeathed John Maurice and his younger brothers from their father’s second marriage the district of Freudenberg, some villages in the Haingericht and a third part of the administration of the city of Siegen.

Henry served the Dutch Republic as an officer in the Dutch States Army since 1632, in diplomatic missions and as governor of Hulst since 1645. He died in 1652 and was first buried in Terborg.

After the death of Mary Magdalene’s mother in 1649, her father remarried at Wisch Castle in Terborg on 13 January 1656 to Countess Sophie Margaret of Nassau-Siegen (Siegen Castle, 16 April 1610 – Wisch Castle, Terborg, 8/18 May 1665), an older sister of Mary Magdalene’s husband. That marriage remained childless. After the death of her father in September 1661, Mary Magdalene succeeded him countess of Bronkhorst, lady of Wisch, Borculo, Lichtenvoorde and Wildenborch, and hereditary lady banneret of the Duchy of Guelders and the County of Zutphen. Thus, these properties came into the possession of the House of Nassau.

She was buried on 29 December in the Fürstengruft there.

Issue

From the marriage of Henry and Mary Magdalene the following children were born:
 Ernestine (Wisch Castle, Terborg, 15 November 1647 – Hulst, October 1652).
 Fürst William Maurice (Wisch Castle, Terborg, 18/28 January 1649 – Nassauischer Hof, Siegen, 23 January 1691Jul.), succeeded his uncle John Maurice as Fürst of Nassau-Siegen in 1679. Married at Schaumburg Castle on 6 February 1678Jul. to Princess Ernestine Charlotte of Nassau-Schaumburg (Schaumburg Castle, 20 May 1662Jul. – Nassauischer Hof, Siegen, 21 February 1732).
 Sophie Amalie (Wisch Castle, Terborg, 10 January 1650Jul. – Mitau, 15/25 November 1688), married in The Hague on 5 October 1675Greg. to Duke Frederick Casimir of Courland (6 July 1650 – 22 January 1698).
 Frederick Henry (Wisch Castle, Terborg, 11 November 1651 – Roermond, 4 September 1676), was a colonel in the Dutch States Army.
The sons William Maurice and Frederick Henry were adopted by their uncle John Maurice of Nassau-Siegen after the death of their father. William Maurice, Sophie Amalie and Frederick Henry were elevated to the rank and title of prince(ss) in 1664.

Ancestors

Notes

References

Sources
 
 
  (1911). "Frederik Hendrik, Friedrich Heinrich". In:  en  (redactie), Nieuw Nederlandsch Biografisch Woordenboek (in Dutch). Vol. Eerste deel. Leiden: A.W. Sijthoff. p. 902.
  (1911). "Hendrik, Heinrich". In:  en  (redactie), Nieuw Nederlandsch Biografisch Woordenboek (in Dutch). Vol. Eerste deel. Leiden: A.W. Sijthoff. p. 1075–1076.
  (1911). "Willem Maurits, Wilhelm Moritz". In:  en  (redactie), Nieuw Nederlandsch Biografisch Woordenboek (in Dutch). Vol. Eerste deel. Leiden: A.W. Sijthoff. p. 1578.
 
 
 
 
 
 
 
 
 
 
 
 
  (2004). "Die Fürstengruft zu Siegen und die darin von 1669 bis 1781 erfolgten Beisetzungen". In:  u.a. (Redaktion), Siegener Beiträge. Jahrbuch für regionale Geschichte (in German). Vol. 9. Siegen: Geschichtswerkstatt Siegen – Arbeitskreis für Regionalgeschichte e.V. p. 183–202.
 
 
 
  (1882). Het vorstenhuis Oranje-Nassau. Van de vroegste tijden tot heden (in Dutch). Leiden: A.W. Sijthoff/Utrecht: J.L. Beijers.

External links
 Nassau. In: Medieval Lands. A prosopography of medieval European noble and royal families, compiled by Charles Cawley.
 Nassau Part 5. In: An Online Gotha, by Paul Theroff.

Limburg-Stirum, Mary Magdalene
Limburg-Stirum, Mary Magdalene
House of Limburg-Stirum
Countesses of Nassau
∞
Limburg-Stirum, Mary Magdalene
Limburg-Stirum, Mary Magdalene
Limburg-Stirum, Mary Magdalene
Limburg-Stirum, Mary Magdalene
Limburg-Stirum, Mary Magdalene
Limburg-Stirum, Mary Magdalene
Limburg-Stirum, Mary Magdalene